Zaalouk or Zalouk (Berber: ⵣⴰⵄⵍⵓⴽ ) is a Moroccan salad of cooked eggplants and tomatoes. After being grilled, the eggplant is combined with the tomatoes and seasoned with spices and garlic.

References

 https://www.halalhomecooking.com/zaalouk-cooked-aubergine-tomato-salad-dip/ 

Eggplant dishes
Moroccan cuisine
Arab cuisine
Appetizers
Vegetarian cuisine